Ursula Poznanski (born October 30, 1968) is an Austrian writer. She won the Deutscher Jugendliteraturpreis (German Children's Literature Award), Jugendjury (Youth Jury) prize in 2011 for her thriller novel Erebos, which has been translated into 22 languages.

Life and work 
Ursula Poznanski was born in Vienna and grew up in Perchtoldsdorf and, after completing high school, took courses in Japanese studies, journalism, law and theater studies at the University of Vienna, but did not complete a degree. In 1996 she began working as an editor in a medical publishing house. In 2000, after the birth of her son, she took part in a scriptwriting competition run by the Austrian Broadcasting Corporation; her script for a romantic comedy did not win.

In 2001, her first manuscript Buchstabendschungel was accepted by the Austrian publishing house Dachs and was published in 2003. In the following years she released more children's books and worked in parallel on her first young adult novel. However, she found when searching for a publisher that her book did not fit the market requirements. She instead wrote the manuscript for her first youth thriller Erebos, which was published in 2010 by Loewe Verlag.

She lives with her family in the south of Vienna.

Awards 

 2005: Kinder- und Jugendbuchpreis der Stadt Wien (Child and Youth Book Prize of the City of Vienna) for Die allerbeste Prinzessin
 2010: Ulmer Unke for Erebos
 2011: Deutscher Jugendliteraturpreis (German Children's Literature Award), Jugendjury (Youth Jury) award for Erebos
 2011: JuBu Buch des Monats (JuBu Book of the Month) for Erebos
 2012: Kinder-/Jugendhörbuch des Monats (Children's / Young Adult's Book of the Month) for January 2012 for hr2-kultur's Hörbuchbestenliste, 3rd place for Saeculum
 2012: Saeculum was included in the collection published by Österreichischer Staatspreis für Kinder- und Jugendliteratur (Austrian Children and Youth Book Prize)
 2016: Hansjörg-Martin-Preis – Kinder- und Jugendkrimipreis (Hansjörg Martin Prize for Child and Youth Crime) for Layers
 2018: Österreichischer Krimipreis (Austrian Crime Award)

Works 
Vanitas series (thriller)

 Vanitas: Schwarz wie Erde. Knaur, München 2019, 

Youth thrillers

 Erebos. Loewe, Bindlach 2010, 
 Saeculum. Loewe, Bindlach 2011, 
 Layers. Loewe, Bindlach 2015, 
 Elanus. Loewe, Bindlach 2016, 
 Aquila. Loewe, Bindlach 2017, 
 Thalamus. Loewe, Bindlach 2018, 
 Erebos 2. Loewe, Bindlach 2019, 
 Cryptos. Loewe, Bindlach 2020, 
 Shelter. Loewe, Bindlach 2021, 

Beatrice-Kaspary series (thrillers)

 Fünf. Wunderlich, Reinbek 2012, 
 Blinde Vögel. Wunderlich, Reinbek 2013, 
 Stimmen. Wunderlich, Reinbek 2015, 
 Schatten. Wunderlich, Reinbek 2017, 

Eleria trilogy (dystopian)

 Die Verratenen. Loewe, Bindlach 2012, .
 Die Verschworenen. Loewe, Bindlach 2013, .
 Die Vernichteten. Loewe, Bindlach 2014, .

Children's books

 Theo Piratenkönig. Illustrated by Friedericke Rave. Dachs, Wien 2003, 
 Spanier küssen anders. G&G, Wien 2008, 
 Buchstabendschungel. Illustrated by Jens Rassmus. Dachs, Wien 2003, 
 All diese Zahlen. Illustrated by Jens Rassmus. Dachs, Wien 2004, 
 Die allerbeste Prinzessin. Drawings and collages by Sybille Hein. Loewe, Bindlach 2018, 
 Redaktion Tintenklex: Das Geheimnis der 67 Erpresserbriefe.
 Redaktion Tintenklex: Das geheimnisvolle Grab.
 Pauline Pechfee. Illustrated by Friederike Rave. Residenz 2007, 

Collaborations

 Fremd. With Arno Strobel. Wunderlich, Reinbek 2015, 
 Anonym. With Arno Strobel. Wunderlich, Reinbek 2016, 
 Invisible. With Arno Strobel. Wunderlich, Reinbek 2018, 

Contributions to:

 O Gruselgraus!
 Wenn du ein Gespenst kennst ...

References

External links 
 
 
 Personal website
 Official Website for author duo Ursula Poznanski and Arno Strobel
 Ursula Poznanski at Loewe-Verlag
 Interview with Ursula Poznanski at KinderundJugendmedien.de
 Interview with Ursula Poznanski at jugendbuch-couch.de

1968 births
Living people
Writers from Vienna
People from Mödling District
University of Vienna alumni
21st-century American women writers